Shibhnath Sarkar is an Indian bridge player. He won gold at the 2018 Asian Games with Pranab Bardhan in the men's pair event.

References 

Living people
Indian contract bridge players
Asian Games gold medalists for India
Bridge players at the 2018 Asian Games
Asian Games medalists in bridge
Medalists at the 2018 Asian Games
Year of birth missing (living people)